Jack Joseph Murray Harvey (born 15 April 1993) is a British auto racing driver who competes full-time in the NTT IndyCar Series, driving the No. 30 Chevrolet for Rahal Letterman Lanigan Racing, and a former member of McLaren's Young Driver Programme.

Career

Karting
Harvey began his kart racing career at the age of nine. In 2006 he won the MSA Super One British title by a single point, and the Kartmasters British Grand Prix, both in the ICA-J class.

In 2007 Harvey became a driver for the Italian Maranello team, in the newly created KF3 category.
He ended up winning four trophies by the end of the year, with the Andrea Margutti Trophy, another Kartmasters title, the Italian Open Masters championship, and became European Champion in KF3.

For the 2008 season, Harvey signed with the Birel Motorsport team as a KF2 driver, and became Asia-Pacific Champion.

Formula BMW
Harvey began his formula racing career in the 2009 Formula BMW Europe season with Fortec Motorsport. Harvey is a member of the Racing Steps Foundation, helping young British drivers achieve success in the national and international series. He finished seventh overall in the championship, with a win at the Masters of Formula 3-supporting round at Zandvoort and two poles at Zandvoort and Monza. Following his successes, the British Racing Drivers' Club made him a member of their "Rising Star" initiative.

In 2010 Harvey finished the year as vice–champion after an intense battle with Robin Frijns, the eventual champion. Harvey entered the final round of the championship with a seven-point lead over Frijns, and extended his lead during the final round by taking the pole position for both races; unfortunately he was pushed out of the track in the first race by DAMS driver Javier Tarancón.

Formula 3
For 2011, Harvey moved into the British Formula 3 Championship with Carlin. Harvey finished 9th, scoring one victory and four podiums in his first season. For 2012, he set his sights on winning the championship, opting to extend his commitment with Carlin.

After 7 wins amassing a total of 12 podium finishes, Jack Harvey became the 2012 British Formula 3 champion. After 29 races, Jack Harvey gained 319 points.
Winning the championship earned Harvey an entry for the Formula Renault 3.5 rookie test.

GP3
Harvey signed with Lotus GP to race in the GP3 Series in 2013 and retained the backing from Racing Steps Foundation. In the same week, Harvey was named official driver coach for Sean Walkinshaw Racing in the new BRDC Formula 4 series.

Indy Lights
For the 2014 season, Harvey moved to the United States and signed to race for Schmidt Peterson Motorsports in the Indy Lights series, the established junior feeder series for the Indycar Series. He finished the season in second place in the championship standings, after collecting four wins and 10 podiums in 14 races. As a consequence, in recognition of his position as the top-performing British driver in North American motorsport, he was also awarded the British Racing Drivers' Club's Earl Howe Trophy for 2014.

Harvey returned to Schmidt Peterson for the 2015 Indy Lights season. He collected two wins, six second-place finishes, and 12 top 5s in 16 races, which put him runner-up in the overall standings, behind Spencer Pigot.

IndyCar

Harvey made his IndyCar debut at the 2017 Indianapolis 500, driving for Michael Shank Racing in association with Andretti Autosport. He finished 31st after contact with debris from Conor Daly's car on lap 65. Later in the 2017 IndyCar season, Harvey replaced Sebastián Saavedra (who himself had replaced Mikhail Aleshin) at Schmidt Peterson Motorsports for the final two races of the season.

For the 2018 IndyCar season, Harvey rejoined Michael Shank Racing, in a technical partnership with Schmidt Peterson Motorsports, for 6 races.

In 2019, the Meyer Shank Racing program upped its schedule to 10 races. In the pandemic-shortened 2020 season, Harvey ran in all the races.

2021
In 2021 Harvey and Meyer Shank Racing would run a full schedule. Throughout the year Harvey and MSR showed significant improvements, especially in qualifying where Harvey was frequently a Q2 or better qualifier throughout much of the race weekends. Harvey announced during IndyCar's summer break that he would depart Meyer Shank Racing at the end of the year after being offered a contract by an undisclosed team. On 11 October 2021, it was announced that Harvey would race for Rahal Letterman Lanigan Racing in 2022. He will drive the #45 Honda Hy-Vee car.

Racing record

Career summary

 As Harvey was a guest driver, he was ineligible for points.

Complete GP3 Series results
(key) (Races in bold indicate pole position) (Races in italics indicate fastest lap)

American open-wheel racing results
(key) (Races in bold indicate pole position) (Races in italics indicate fastest lap)

Indy Lights

IndyCar Series
(key)

* Season still in progress.

Indianapolis 500

References

External links 

1993 births
Living people
People from North Kesteven District
English racing drivers
Formula BMW Europe drivers
British Formula Three Championship drivers
Formula 3 Euro Series drivers
FIA Formula 3 European Championship drivers
GP3 Series drivers
Indy Lights drivers
IndyCar Series drivers
Indianapolis 500 drivers
Eurasia Motorsport drivers
Fortec Motorsport drivers
Carlin racing drivers
ART Grand Prix drivers
Arrow McLaren SP drivers
Meyer Shank Racing drivers
Rahal Letterman Lanigan Racing drivers
Formula BMW Pacific drivers
Andretti Autosport drivers